Stronger is the second studio album by Swedish singer Agnes Carlsson, released on 11 October 2006 by Ariola Records. Two songs from the album, "I Believe in You" and "I Had a Feelin'", were covered by German girl group No Angels on their 2007 album Destiny. The song "Love Is All Around" has been covered by artists from at least three other continents.

Reception
Markus Larsson of Aftonbladet stated, "Agnes is an obvious talent with a strong voice, but no one seems to know what to make out of it, not the record company, not the songwriters, not the producers, not even Agnes herself."

Nina Sköldqvist of Helsingborgs Dagblad wrote that Stronger contains a variety of genres, including "a heavy ballad" like "(What Do I Do With) All This Love", "spirited R&B" like "Kick Back Relax" and the "MTV-like" "My Boy" and "Everybody".

Track listing

Notes
  signifies a vocal producer

Charts

Weekly charts

Year-end charts

Release history

References

2006 albums
Agnes (singer) albums
Albums produced by Ghost (production team)
Ariola Records albums